El Jaish Handball Team was the handball team of El Jaish SC, a multisport club based in the Al-Duhail area of Doha, Qatar. It used to compete in the Qatar Handball League (QHL). The team which was officially founded in 2007, became a dominant force in the QHL since its formation.

The team has previously won the continental championship, the Asian Club League Handball Championship, on one occasion in 2013. In April 2017, the club was taken over by Lekhwiya and rebranded into Al-Duhail SC.

Honours
 Qatar Handball League
 Winners (4): 2010–11, 2013–14, 2015–16, 2016–17
 Asian Club League Handball Championship
 Winners (1): 2013
 IHF Super Globe
 Third place (1): 2013

Notable former players
 Dan Beutler
 Nándor Fazekas
 Jovo Damjanović
 Žarko Marković
 Goran Stojanović
 Zoran Roganović
 Ahmed El-Ahmar
 Mirza Kapić
 Duško Čelica
 Deni Velić
 Janko Kević
 Milan Šajin

Managerial history
 Ivica Obrvan (2013)
 Kamel Akkab (2013–)
 Toni Gerona (2015-2017)

See also
 El Jaish SC
 IHF Super Globe

References

External links
 Official website 

Qatari handball clubs
2007 establishments in Qatar
Handball clubs established in 2007
El Jaish SC
Sport in Al Rayyan